The Czech Republic participated in the Eurovision Song Contest 2021 with the song "Omaga" written by Ben Cristóvão and Filip Vlček. The song was performed by Benny Cristo, which is the artistic name of singer Ben Cristóvão. Benny Cristo was announced by the Czech broadcaster Česká televize (ČT) on 13 May 2020 as the Czech representative for the 2021 contest in Rotterdam, Netherlands after he was due to compete in the 2020 contest with "Kemama" before the 2020 event's cancellation, while the song "Omaga" was presented to the public on 16 February 2021.

Czech Republic was drawn to compete in the second semi-final of the Eurovision Song Contest which took place on 20 May 2021. Performing during the show in position 3, "Omaga" was not announced among the top 10 entries of the second semi-final and therefore did not qualify to compete in the final. It was later revealed that Czech Republic placed fifteenth out of the 17 participating countries in the semi-final with 23 points.

Background 

The nation competed in the contest on three consecutive occasions between 2007 and 2009 without qualifying to the final: in 2007 Kabát performing "Malá dáma" placed 28th (last) in the semi-final achieving only one point, in 2008 Tereza Kerndlová performing "Have Some Fun" placed 18th (second to last) in her semi-final scoring nine points and in 2009 Gipsy.cz performing the song "Aven Romale" placed 18th (last) in their semi-final failing to score any points. The Czech broadcaster withdrew from the contest between 2010 and 2014 citing reasons such as low viewing figures and poor results for their absence. Since returning to the contest in 2015 and qualifying to the final for the first time in 2016, Czech Republic has featured in three finals. In 2019, the country qualified to the final placing 11th with Lake Malawi and the song "Friend of a Friend".

The Czech national broadcaster, Česká televize (ČT), broadcasts the event within Czech Republic and organises the selection process for the nation's entry. The broadcaster has used both national finals and internal selections to select the Czech Eurovision entry in the past. ČT confirmed their intentions to participate at the 2021 Eurovision Song Contest in May 2020. The broadcaster later confirmed in January 2021 that the Czech entry for the 2021 contest would be selected internally.

Before Eurovision

Internal selection 
The Czech entry for the Eurovision Song Contest 2021 was selected internally by ČT. On 13 May 2020, the broadcaster confirmed that Benny Cristo would remain as the Czech representative for the 2021 Eurovision Song Contest. Kryštof Šámal was assigned as the new Czech Head of Delegation for the Eurovision Song Contest and managed the song selection process. On 4 January 2021, Šámal announced that several songs were in contention and that a decision regarding which one would be selected was imminent. The song "Omaga" was presented to the public as the Czech entry via the release of the official music video, directed by Jan Strach, on 16 February 2021. "Omaga", which was written by Benny Cristo himself together with Filip Vlček, was selected by ČT and was one of three songs shortlisted by the broadcaster from several proposals that Cristo submitted in December 2021.

At Eurovision 

According to Eurovision rules, all nations with the exceptions of the host country and the "Big Five" (France, Germany, Italy, Spain and the United Kingdom) are required to qualify from one of two semi-finals in order to compete in the final; the top ten countries from each semi-final progress to the final. The European Broadcasting Union (EBU) split up the competing countries into six different pots based on voting patterns from previous contests, with countries with favourable voting histories put into the same pot. The semi-final allocation draw held for the Eurovision Song Contest 2020 on 28 January 2020 was used for the 2021 contest, which Czech Republic was placed into the second semi-final, to be held on 20 May 2021, and was scheduled to perform in the first half of the show.

Once all the competing songs for the 2021 contest had been released, the running order for the semi-finals was decided by the shows' producers rather than through another draw, so that similar songs were not placed next to each other. Czech Republic was set to perform in position 3, following the entry from Estonia and before the entry from Greece.

In the Czech Republic, the semi-finals were broadcast on ČT2 and the final was broadcast on ČT1. All three shows featured commentary by Jan Maxián and 2019 Czech Eurovision representative Albert Černý. The Czech spokesperson, who will announce the top 12-point score awarded by the Czech jury during the final, was Taťána Kuchařová.

Semi-final 
Benny Cristo took part in technical rehearsals on 10 and 13 May, followed by dress rehearsals on 19 and 20 May. This included the jury show on 19 May where the professional juries of each country watched and voted on the competing entries.

The Czech performance featured Benny Cristo wearing a gold sparkly jacket and trousers with a red rose on his chest and appearing on stage with four dancers in street-casual outfits. Cristo's outfit was designed by Jiri Kalfar. The performance began with Cristo in the centre of several lighting poles, of which he later walked out from and was gradually joined by the dancers. The LED screens displayed kaleidoscopic images with a psychedelic colour scheme, and the performers concluded the performance by walking the catwalk to the B-stage. The four dancers that performed with Cristo were Alberto Gola, Aneta Prchalová, Anna Lipoldová and Robin Šeba, while the co-composer of "Omaga" Filip Vlček was also featured as an off-stage backing vocalist.

At the end of the show, the Czech Republic was not announced among the top 10 entries in the second semi-final and therefore failed to qualify to compete in the final. It was later revealed that Czech Republic placed fifteenth in the semi-final, receiving a total of 23 points: 0 points from the televoting and 23 points from the juries.

Voting 
Voting during the three shows involved each country awarding two sets of points from 1-8, 10 and 12: one from their professional jury and the other from televoting. Each nation's jury consisted of five music industry professionals who are citizens of the country they represent. This jury judged each entry based on: vocal capacity; the stage performance; the song's composition and originality; and the overall impression by the act. In addition, each member of a national jury may only take part in the panel once every three years, and no jury was permitted to discuss of their vote with other members or be related in any way to any of the competing acts in such a way that they cannot vote impartially and independently. The individual rankings of each jury member in an anonymised form as well as the nation's televoting results were released shortly after the grand final.

Below is a breakdown of points awarded to the Czech Republic and awarded by the Czech Republic in the second semi-final and grand final of the contest, and the breakdown of the jury voting and televoting conducted during the two shows:

Points awarded to the Czech Republic

Points awarded by the Czech Republic

Detailed voting results 
The following members comprised the Czech jury:
 Milan Havrda (Boris Carloff)
 
 Deborah Kahl (Debbi)
  (Elis Mraz)
 Miroslav Žbirka

References

2021
Countries in the Eurovision Song Contest 2021
Eurovision